1000 de la Gauchetière is a skyscraper in Montreal, Quebec, Canada. It is named for its address at 1000 De la Gauchetière Street West in the downtown core. It is Montreal's second tallest building. It rises to the maximum height approved by the city (the elevation of Mount Royal) at 205 m (673 ft) and 51 floors. A popular feature of the building is its atrium, which holds a large ice skating rink.

History
The building was designed by Lemay & Associates and Dimakopoulos & Associates architects, and built in 1992 at the same time as the nearby 1250 René-Lévesque which rises at 47 floors. It is an example of postmodern architecture, with a distinctive triangular copper roof as well as four copper-capped rotunda entrances at the tower base corners, which were inspired from the Mary, Queen of the World Cathedral on the north side of the building, following the trend set by Place de la Cathédrale (KPMG Tower) of Montreal skyscrapers borrowing some of their design from that of the nearest church. Also, the semispherical corner caps mirror the shape of the half-circular windows of neighbouring Marriott Château Champlain hotel, which were themselves inspired by the arches of the adjoining Windsor Station.

The 1000 de la Gauchetière was built by Pomerleau Inc., the largest construction company in Quebec and one of the top general contractors in Canada.

When it was built, 1000 de la Gauchetière was owned jointly by Bell Canada and Teleglobe. With the merger of all CDPQ real estate assets in 2011, ownership has been transferred to Ivanhoé Cambridge. In 2021, it was bought by the real estate companies MACH and Groupe Petra.

Height and architecture
To be precise, the tower is Montreal's tallest if it is measured to the roof. Although 1250 René-Lévesque possesses a spire and the CIBC Tower has an antenna that exceeds 1000 de La Gauchetière in height, the buildings themselves are shorter. Also, when it is viewed as part of the skyline, 1000 de la Gauchetière appears from certain angles to be shorter because it is built on lower ground, allowing it to be taller while it still obeyed height restrictions relative to Mount Royal. 

The building's structural core is of concrete, with steel making up the rest of the floorplates. It is serviced by 22 elevators, and its recessed corners allow up to 12 corner offices per floor.

The building's architecture is similar to that of the Chase Tower in Dallas, Texas, United States, but with the street-level architecture projecting out in a distinct style, reducing the visual and psychological impact of the entire building from this viewpoint. Such details are features of postmodern architecture.

Features
In addition to its office space and shopping areas, it includes a full-size indoor ice skating rink, a physical fitness centre, a major bus terminal (the Downtown Terminus) serving RTL city and commuter buses to Longueuil, Brossard and other South Shore communities, and links to other underground city buildings, Central Station, Lucien-L'Allier Station and the Bonaventure Metro station.

Tenants
Analysis Group, Inc.
Borden Ladner Gervais LLP
BDO
Cofomo
De Grandpré Chait LLP
Fidelity Investments
Osler, Hoskin & Harcourt LLP
McCarthy Tétrault LLP
RBC Dominion Securities
Raymond James
IWG
Rogers Communications
Boston Consulting Group
Miller Thomson

See also
List of tallest buildings in Montreal
List of skyscrapers

References

External links
Official website

Skyscrapers in Montreal
Postmodern architecture in Canada
Office buildings completed in 1992
Skyscraper office buildings in Canada
Downtown Montreal